M130 may refer to:
 Mercedes-Benz M130 engine, a straight-6-cylinder engine

M-130 may refer to:
 M-130 highway (Michigan), a road in the United States of America
 Martin M-130, a seaplane